Giants vs. Yanks is the 12th Our Gang short subject comedy released. The Our Gang series (later known as "The Little Rascals") was created by Hal Roach in 1922, and continued production until 1944.

Plot
While the boys are playing their baseball game, a couple living nearby offer to take care of Jack's baby sister, Imogene. Eventually, the gang goes into their house, when they realize there's a litter of puppies in there. By this time, however, the doctor has realized that one of the servants has a contagious disease and decides to quarantine the place, giving the gang a chance to turn into a disaster area.

See also
 Our Gang filmography

Production notes
There is a blooper in the scene where Mickey rigs the treadmill to turn the laundry. In a couple of scenes, the goat is walking on the treadmill, but the laundry is not turning. Another blooper has the Giants (The Gang) pitching, but Ernie is batting.

Mary Kornman does not appear in this film.

When the television rights for the original silent Pathé Our Gang comedies were sold to National Telepix and other distributors, several episodes were retitled. This film was released into TV syndication as "Mischief Makers" in 1960 under the title The Little League. About two-thirds of the original film was included. This film was also released as an episode of "Those Lovable Scallawags with Their Gangs" series under the title Giants vs. Yanks. Two-thirds of the original film was included. Deleted scenes from this print include the entire sequence involving Ernie, Farina, and Squeaky attempting to retrieve a live turkey. Some of the original inter-titles were left intact.

Cast

The Gang
 Joe Cobb as Squeaky
 Jackie Condon as Squealer
 Jack Davis as Jack, alias Bugle Nose Davis
 Mickey Daniels as Mickey, alias Ironman Mickey
 Allen Hoskins as Farina
 Ernie Morrison as Ernie
 Doris Oelze as Imogene, Jack's sister
 Dinah the Mule as herself

Additional cast
 Andy Samuel as Cooty Martin, one of the Yanks
 Roy Brooks as The plainclothes officer
 Frank Coghlan Jr. as One of the Yanks
 Beth Darlington as Mrs. Reddy a.k.a. Mr. Wife
 Dick Gilbert as Hungry Hogan
 William Gillespie as Mr. Reddy a.k.a. Mr. Husband
 Clara Guiol as The Maid who becomes ill
 Florence Hoskins as The other maid
 Wallace Howe as Doctor
 Joseph Morrison as Ernie and Farina’s father

External links 
 
 

1923 comedy films
American black-and-white films
Films directed by Robert F. McGowan
Hal Roach Studios short films
American silent short films
Our Gang films
1923 short films
Pathé films
1920s American films
Silent American comedy films